Lansdowne Terrace is a street in Bloomsbury, London WC1.

It runs south to north from Guilford Street to Brunswick Square, with houses on the west side and Coram's Fields on the east side.

Nos 1 to 4 are Grade II listed houses, built in 1794, and designed by James Burton.

The main entrance to International Hall, a hall of residence owned by the University of London is at the northern end.

Horizon: A Review of Literature and Art, edited by Cyril Connolly, was based there throughout its existence in the 1940s.

References

External links

Streets in the London Borough of Camden
Grade II listed buildings in the London Borough of Camden
Bloomsbury
Grade II listed houses
Houses completed in the 18th century